Robert Joseph Kelly (born March 4, 1938) is a retired United States Navy four star admiral who served as Commander in Chief, United States Pacific Fleet (CINCPACFLT) from 1991 to 1994.

Biography
Born in Reading, Pennsylvania, Kelly graduated from the U. S. Naval Academy in 1959 and was designated a Naval Aviator in 1961.
Kelly's flying career included air combat in Vietnam War Staff tours included the Naval Postgraduate School and in the Pentagon.  He was  a graduate of the Navy Nuclear Training Program, and went on to command  . On 28 April 1983, he was guiding USS ENTERPRISE home from an 8 month WESTPAC deployment when the ship ran aground near its home port of Alameda. In a news conference, then Captain Kelly said bluntly: 'I am the captain and I was in control. I am totally responsible for what happened.”  He served as Vice Director of Operations for the Joint Chiefs of Staff, Director of the Institute for Strategic Studies at the National War College, and Deputy Chief of Naval Operations for Plans, Policy, and Operations.  His final naval assignment was as Commander in Chief, United States Pacific Fleet (CINCPACFLT) from 1991 to 1994.  During his time at CINCPACTFLT he punished a number of subordinates for violating the Navy's policy against sexist behavior.  Later, he told a sexually explicit joke at a staff meeting and was subsequently rebuked for it by his superiors.  He was the senior Naval Aviator at the 1991 Tailhook scandal, and was subsequently recommended for forced retirement by Secretary of the Navy John Howard Dalton.  After retirement, he was the Executive Vice President of The Wing Group, a leading international developer of energy projects. In March 1999, Kelly became the President and Chief Operating Officer of Energetics, Inc., an energy consulting company and wholly owned subsidiary of the VSE Corporation.  Kelly has been the president of Pensacola Country Club.

References

1938 births
Living people
United States Naval Academy alumni
United States Naval Aviators
United States Navy personnel of the Vietnam War
Recipients of the Air Medal
United States Navy admirals
Recipients of the Legion of Merit
American chief operating officers